The Mastra mine is a gold mine in Turkey. The mine is operated by the Turkish conglomerate Koza İpek Holding. The mine is located in Gümüşhane Province in eastern Turkey. It's the second oldest gold mine in country after Çukuralan mine.

References 

Gold mines in Turkey
Buildings and structures in Gümüşhane Province